The Centre for Pharmacy Postgraduate Education (CPPE) is part of the Manchester Pharmacy School, in the University of Manchester, UK. CPPE was created in May 1991 as a direct response to the perceived lack of continuing professional development support given to community pharmacists, as outlined in Section 63 of the Health Services and Public Health Act 1968.

History

The CPPE was originally part of the North West Regional Health Authority and its funding came directly from the National Health Service. The original head office was based at Gateway House in Manchester. it began with a mandate to provide free access to continuing professional development resources for community pharmacists. It later included all pharmacists providing services in the NHS in England.

It became a part of the University of Manchester in August 1995, operating under an agreement with the NHS Executive: Office of the Chief Pharmacist. The original management had members from the Regional Health Authority, the University of Manchester and the Department of Health. The first director was Alison Blenkinsopp, who went on to be Professor of the Practice Pharmacy at Bradford University. The director  was Matthew Shaw.

The CPPE is now commissioned to provide continuing professional development for community pharmacists. This took the form of workshops and distance learning materials. Workshops, first launched in 1992, were run on a national basis using a network of tutors. By March 1992 65 tutors were employed, later growing to 99. The learning offered in workshops covers a number of platforms including online learning, workshops, e-courses and independent study.

In 2006, 15 years after the CPPE was established, the Department of Health embarked on a review which found that it was an effective provider of high-quality learning resources to pharmacists and pharmacy technicians across England, and it considered the CPPE a centre of excellence.

References

External links 
 

Pharmacy organisations in the United Kingdom
Departments of the University of Manchester